Lower Slate Lake is a lake in the State of Alaska in the Tongass National Forest. It is designated as the disposal site for the tailings from Coeur Alaska's Kensington mine.

References

See also
Coeur Alaska, Inc. v. Southeast Alaska Conservation Council

Lakes of Juneau, Alaska
Lakes of Alaska